Uyilankulam is a small town in Sri Lanka. It is located within the Mannar District of the Northern Province.

See also
List of towns in Northern Province, Sri Lanka

External links

Populated places in Northern Province, Sri Lanka